The A355 autoroute, known as the "grand western bypass" or "western bypass of Strasbourg", is a motorway that bypasses Strasbourg from the west through the Kochersberg. With a length of 24 km, it connects the junction between the A4 and A35 motorways to the north of Strasbourg to the junction between the A35 and the A352 to the south.

References

See also 

Autonomism
Autoroutes in France
2021 establishments in France